Dennis John Vear (5 April 1938 – 21 December 2017) was a New Zealand cricketer who played three first-class matches for Otago in the early 1960s. He also played for Southland in the Hawke Cup competition.

Vear died in Christchurch on 21 December 2017.

See also
 List of Otago representative cricketers

References

1938 births
2017 deaths
New Zealand cricketers
Otago cricketers